Constantin Ahnger (in some sources Konstantin Ahnger) (10 November 1855 — 27 June 1942) was a Finnish engineer and notable entomologist.

Career

Engineering
Ahnger worked for the Russian railway and telegraph services from the 1880s until the early 1930, stationed in different locations around the country including Irkutsk, Omsk, Ashgabat, Kokand and Taganrog.

For his services, Ahnger was granted the Imperial Russian honorary title of Hovineuvos (Russian: надворный советник; see Court Councillor).

Scientific
On his extensive travels and postings around Russia, Ahnger collected over 60,000 insect and other specimens. They are contained in the collections of the University of Helsinki, Saint Petersburg State University, Howard University, and others.

He also established several museums in the cities he was posted to, and received a silver medal from the Russian Geographical Society for his scientific efforts.

Over thirty species are named after him, including Anacanthotermes ahngerianus.

Personal life
Constantin Ahnger was born in Kuopio to Colonel Oscar Ahnger, who later became the Chief of Police of Viipuri, and Alexandrine  von Koberwein.

His sister was the opera singer and teacher of voice Alexandra Ahnger.

References

20th-century Finnish engineers
Finnish entomologists
1855 births
1942 deaths
People from Kuopio